Karavostamo is a seaside village on the island of Ikaria, Greece. It is composed of an upper and lower village and is situated in the northern part of the island east of the municipal unit of Evdilos. It has 499 inhabitants (2011). It has small houses amphitheatrically built, two churches, several chapels, nursery, primary school, modern oil press, streams, old watermills, and beaches. The traditional "Pigi tou Halika," Halika Spring, stands just off the main road. Historically it was the central meeting place of the villagers, where they would fill their pitchers with water, wash their clothes, rest, and discuss village issues.

In the upper village with the farm houses surrounded by terraces, some cultivated and some not, villagers dry figs in the sun, make onion strings for winter usage, and shell and dry nuts and almonds. There is also a "kamini" or place where charcoal is produced, one of the few still existing in Ikaria which has had a long-standing tradition in the field since before the Second World War.

References

Populated places in Ikaria (regional unit)